St. Patrick's Church is a former Roman Catholic church in Sydney, Nova Scotia. The church was designated a Nova Scotian heritage property on November 3, 1983.

From 1912 to 1950, Sydney's Lebanese Maronite community used the church.

It is the oldest still-standing Roman Catholic church in Cape Breton, having been built in 1828.

References

External Links 
 St. Patrick’s Church Museum – Old Sydney Society
 The Founding of St. Patrick’s Church – Historic Nova Scotia

Heritage sites in Nova Scotia
Buildings and structures in the Cape Breton Regional Municipality
Roman Catholic churches in Nova Scotia